Henrietta Hamilton Stephen MBE (9 December 1925 to 21 May 2020), known as Rita, was a trade unionist who fought for the rights of working women and equal pay in the 1960s and 1970s.

Early life 
Stephen was born in Glasgow to James Stephen and Mary Stephen (née Morton). She went to Queen's Park Secondary School.

Early trade union activity 
Leaving school Stephen worked at the Post Office for 17 years. Stephen became a shop steward for the Union of Post Office Workers. In 1957 her trade union activity was rewarded with a one-year trade union scholarship to the London School of Economics (LSE). While at LSE she led a campaign for shower facilities for students living off site. Stephen then went onto study at McGill University in Montreal, Canada.

Campaigning for equal rights 
As a National Official of the Clerical and Administrative Workers' Union, Stephen was responsible for negotiating conditions for office workers, clerk and secretaries, whose members were mostly women. She specialised in trade union education and equal rights. 
After the Labour government brought in the Equal Pay Act of 1970, the slow implementation of the legislation prompted Stephen and her trade union colleagues to encourage local officers to submit equal pay claims to employers.

Stephen was involved in creating TUC policies for equal pay and education.

In June 1973 Stephen was appointed MBE for 'For services to the Food Standards Committee'.

Committee membership 
Along with membership of Trade Unions Stephen represented the trade union movement on many committees.

Before 1957 - Union of Post Office Workers - Shop Steward

1960 - 1965 - Clerical and Administrative Workers’ Union - London Area Organiser

1965 - 1971 - Clerical and Administrative Workers’ Union - Editor of The Clerk, the monthly journal

1965 - 1989 - Clerical and Administrative Workers’ Union - National Official

1965 - 2000s - Mary Macarthur Educational Trust - Secretary

1968 - 1980 - Food Standards Committee - Member

1972 - 1989 - APEX - National Official

1973 - 1989 - British Wool Marketing Board - Member

1989 - 1991 - National Union of General and Municipal Workers - National Officer

1973 - 1983 - Monopolies and Mergers Commission - Member

1976 - 2005 - London School of Economics - Governor

References 

1925 births
2020 deaths
Members of the Order of the British Empire
British trade unionists